Kreis Schildberg was a county in the southern administrative district of Posen, in the Prussian province of Posen. It presently lies in the south-eastern part of Polish region of Greater Poland Voivodeship.

Military command 
Kreis Schildberg was part of the military command in Posen at Ostrowo.

Court system 
The main court was in Ostrowo, with lower courts in Schildberg.

Civil registry offices 
In 1905, these civil registry offices served the following towns in Kreis Schildberg:   
Deutschdorf       
Grabow       
Kobylagora
Mixstadt       
Morawin       
Parzynow      
Przytocznica    
Schildberg

Police districts 
In 1905, these police districts served towns in Kreis Schildberg:        
Grabow       
Kobylagora     
Mixstadt     
Schildberg

Catholic churches 
In 1905, these Catholic parish churches served towns in Kreis Schildberg:   
Bukownica    
Chlewo       
Doruchow     
Grabow       
Kobylagora  
Kotlow       
Mikorzyn       
Mixstadt      
Myschanow      
Parzynow       
Przedborow     
Rogaszyce                  
Schildberg             
Wyschanow

Protestant churches 
In 1905, Protestant parish churches served towns in Kreis Schildberg:  
Deutschdorf       
Grabow      
Kempen       
Kobylagora      
Schildberg

External links 
 List of genealogical records
 Kreis Schildberg at Genealogy.Net

Districts of the Province of Posen